On Golden Pond is a 1981 family drama film directed by Mark Rydell from a screenplay written by Ernest Thompson adapted from his 1979 play of the same name. It stars Katharine Hepburn, Henry Fonda (in his final theatrical film), Jane Fonda, Doug McKeon, Dabney Coleman and William Lanteau. In the film, Norman (Henry Fonda) is a curmudgeon with an estranged relationship with his daughter Chelsea (Jane Fonda). At Golden Pond, he and his wife nevertheless agree to care for Billy, the son of Chelsea's new boyfriend, and a most unexpected relationship blooms.

On Golden Pond was theatrically released on December 4, 1981 to critical and commercial success. Reviewers praised Rydell's direction, Thompson's screenplay and the performances of the cast, while the film grossed $119.3 million domestically, becoming the second highest-grossing film of 1981 in North America. It received ten nominations at the 54th Academy Awards, including for the Best Picture and won three: Best Actor (for Henry Fonda), Best Actress (for Hepburn), and Best Adapted Screenplay.

Plot

An aging couple, Ethel and Norman Thayer, continue a tradition of spending each summer at their cottage on a lake called Golden Pond, in the far reaches of northern New England. When they first arrive, Ethel notices the loons calling on the lake "welcoming them home"; Norman, however, claims he does not hear anything. 

As they resettle into their summer home, Norman, who is about to turn 80, has memory problems arise when he is unable to recognize several family photographs, which he copes with by frequently talking about death and growing old. Ethel does her best to liven up the atmosphere – they play Parcheesi, admire the natural scenery, and talk to the mailman, Charlie, who delivers mail and visits via boat.

They are visited by their only child, daughter Chelsea, who is somewhat estranged from her curmudgeon of a father. She introduces her parents to her fiancé Bill and his 13-year-old son Billy. Norman tries to play mind games with Bill, an apparent pastime of his. Bill lets him know that he knows what Norman is doing and he doesn't really mind, but that he will only take so much of it. 

In another conversation, Chelsea discusses with Ethel her frustration over her relationship with her father, feeling that even though she lives thousands of miles away in Los Angeles, she still feels like she is answering to him. 

Before they depart for a European vacation, Chelsea and Bill ask the Thayers to allow Billy to stay with them for a month while they have some time to themselves. Norman, seeming more senile and cynical than usual due to his 80th birthday and heart palpitations, agrees to Billy's staying.

Billy is at first annoyed by being left with elderly strangers with no friends nearby and nothing to do. He resents Norman's brusque manner, but eventually comes to enjoy their Golden Pond fishing adventures together. Billy also begins to enjoy reading books in the cottage, first reading Treasure Island and later A Tale of Two Cities. 

Billy and Norman soon grow obsessed with catching Norman's fish rival "Walter", which leads to the accidental destruction of the Thayers' motorboat in a rocky area called Purgatory Cove. Norman gets thrown overboard and suffers a head wound and Billy dives in the water to save the old man. They are later rescued by Ethel and Charlie. 

Once healed, Norman goes fishing with Billy and they finally catch "Walter" but they eventually release the fish. Chelsea returns to find out her father has made friends with her fiancé's—now husband's—son. When she sees the change in her father's demeanor, Chelsea attempts something Billy accomplished that she never could: a backflip. She successfully executes the dive in front of a cheering Norman, Billy, and Ethel. Chelsea and Norman finally fully embrace before she departs with Billy.

The final day on Golden Pond comes and the Thayers are loading the last of the boxes. Norman tries to move a heavy box, but starts having heart pain and collapses onto the floor of the porch. Ethel tries unsuccessfully to get the operator to phone the hospital, and goes to comfort her husband. 

After being given nitroglycerin by Ethel, Norman says the pain is gone and attempts to stand to say a final farewell to the lake. Ethel helps Norman to the edge, where they see the loons and Norman says they are calling on the lake "saying goodbye". He notes how they are just like him and Ethel, that their offspring is grown and gone off on her own, and now it is just the two of them.

Cast
 Katharine Hepburn as Ethel Thayer 
 Henry Fonda as Norman Thayer Jr. 
 Jane Fonda as Chelsea Thayer Wayne 
 Doug McKeon as Billy Ray Jr.
 Dabney Coleman as Dr. Bill Ray
 William Lanteau as Charlie Martin
 Christopher Rydell as Sumner Todd (as Chris Rydell)

Production

Jane Fonda purchased the rights to the play specifically for her father, Henry Fonda, to play the role of the cantankerous Norman Thayer. The father-daughter rift depicted on screen closely paralleled the real-life relationship between the two Fondas. The producers originally offered the role of Norman Thayer to James Stewart but he declined.

Screenwriter Thompson spent his summers along the shores of Great Pond, located in Belgrade, Maine, but the film was made on Squam Lake in Holderness, New Hampshire. The house used in the film was leased from a New York physician and was modified significantly for the shoot: an entire second floor was added as a balcony over the main living area at the request of the production designer. After the shoot, the production company was contractually obligated to return the house to its original state but the owner liked the renovations so much that he elected to keep the house that way and asked the crew not to dismantle the second story. A gazebo and a small boathouse were also relocated during the shoot.

The Thayer IV was the name of the boat used in the film. There were three Thayer IV's used in the movie, including one replica used for the crash scene. One was a 1950 Chris-Craft Sportsman (U22-1460), bought by a family in 1982 from marine coordinator Pat Curtin. The other boat, also a Chris-Craft Sportsman (U22-1802), was sold in 1983 by Curtin, as was the boat which Fonda and Hepburn used for their excursions on Golden Pond. At the same time, the buyer of U22-1802 also purchased the replica used in the crash scene. Although the Chris-Craft Sportsman was the main boat used in the movie, the script called for the Thayer IV, a mail boat, a canoe, and a replica of the Thayer IV. These were provided by Patrick Curtin of Eastern Classics, a boatyard in Laconia, New Hampshire, specializing in the restoration of mahogany speedboats. Following World War II, the Sportsman model reappeared as a direct descendant of its 1937 predecessors. The popular model stayed in the Chris Craft line up until 1960. The use of a 1950 Sportsman model as the Thayer IV in On Golden Pond did much to generate interest in antique and classic boats.

Despite their many common acquaintances and long careers in show business, Henry Fonda and Katharine Hepburn had not only never worked together, but never met until working on the film. On the first day of shooting, Hepburn presented Fonda with her longtime companion Spencer Tracy's "lucky" hat, which Fonda wore in the film. Hepburn, who was 74 at the time of filming, performed all her own stunts, including a dive into the pond. The scene in which Norman and step-grandson Billy run their boat into the rocks was filmed repeatedly. The vintage 1951 mahogany Chris-Craft boat, used strictly for the crash scene, was so sturdy that it kept bouncing off the rocks without any damage. The crew had to modify the boat so it would break away in the wreck. The water level in Squam Lake was so low during the summer of production that Fonda and Doug McKeon could have stood during the scene in which they were supposedly clinging to the rocks for fear of drowning. The September water was barely knee-deep, but it was cold enough that the pair had to wear wetsuits under their clothes. Hepburn, on the other hand, dove into the water without the aid of the wetsuit because she wanted the scene to keep its authenticity. Some of the scenes in which Billy takes the boat out on his own were filmed on nearby Lake Winnipesaukee. While filming the scene where Fonda and Hepburn were watching the loons on the lake, the speedboat that zoomed by and disturbed them was so forceful it overturned their canoe in one take. Fonda was immediately taken out of the water and wrapped up in blankets as his health was fragile by then.

The town of Holderness offers boat tours of Squam Lake and the filming locations from the movie. There is also a restaurant called "Walter's Basin", which is named after the trout called "Walter" that Billy catches with Norman. For filming, "Walter" was brought in from a trout pond at the nearby Castle in the Clouds estate. He was released after his capture back into Squam Lake. Leftover footage of Fonda and Hepburn driving through the New Hampshire countryside, as seen in the opening credits, was later used for the opening of the CBS television sitcom Newhart.

The studio behind the film was ITC Entertainment, the British company presided over (until late 1981) by Lord Grade, the television and film mogul. It was Grade who largely raised the financing for the film.

Reception

Box office
With a box office take of $119,285,432, On Golden Pond was the second-highest-grossing film of the year, following Raiders of the Lost Ark, which earned $209,562,121.

Critical reception

On Golden Pond received critical acclaim with critics highlighting the screenplay and performances of the cast (particularly of Hepburn and Henry Fonda). The review aggregator Rotten Tomatoes gives the film an approval rating of 93% based on 43 reviews, with an average rating of 7.7/10. The website's critical consensus reads, "Henry Fonda and Katharine Hepburn are a wondrous duo in On Golden Pond, a wistful drama that movingly explores the twilight years of a loving marriage."

Roger Ebert of the Chicago Sun-Times said: 

In his The New York Times review, Vincent Canby said: 

TV Guide rates it  out of four stars, calling it "a beautifully photographed movie filled with poignancy, humor, and (of course) superb acting... there could have been no finer final curtain for [Henry Fonda] than this." Channel 4 sums up its review by stating: 

Not all reviewers were impressed. David Kehr of the Chicago Reader:  Time Out London says, "Two of Hollywood's best-loved veterans deserved a far better swan song than this sticky confection." Mad magazine satirized the film as On Olden Pond.

Accolades

American Film Institute recognition
 AFI's 100 Years... 100 Movies – Nominated
 AFI's 100 Years... 100 Passions – No. 22
 AFI's 100 Years... 100 Movie Quotes:
 "Listen to me, mister. You're my knight in shining armor. Don't you forget it. You're going to get back on that horse, and I'm going to be right behind you, holding on tight, and away we're gonna go, go, go!" – #88
 "Come here, Norman. Hurry up. The loons! The loons! They're welcoming us back." – Nominated
 AFI's 100 Years of Film Scores – #24
 AFI's 100 Years... 100 Cheers – #45
 AFI's 100 Years... 100 Movies (10th Anniversary Edition) – Nominated

Notes

References

External links

 
 
 
 
 
 
 Squam Lake (On Golden Pond) Official Website

1981 films
1981 drama films
American drama films
Best Drama Picture Golden Globe winners
1980s English-language films
Films scored by Dave Grusin
Films about death
Films about dysfunctional families
Films about father–daughter relationships
Films about fishing
Films about mother–daughter relationships
Films about old age
Films about vacationing
American films based on plays
Films directed by Mark Rydell
Films featuring a Best Actor Academy Award-winning performance
Films featuring a Best Actress Academy Award-winning performance
Films featuring a Best Drama Actor Golden Globe winning performance
Films set in New Hampshire
Films shot in New Hampshire
American films about Alzheimer's disease
Films whose writer won the Best Adapted Screenplay Academy Award
ITC Entertainment films
Universal Pictures films
Films set in New England
1980s American films
British drama films
1980s British films